Alfonso Franco (1466 – 1524), was an Italian painter from Messina, Sicily, active during the Italian Renaissance.

Biography
He was a pupil of Jacobello da Antonello, son of Antonello Da Messina. He painted a Deposition for the church of San Francesco di Paola in Messina; and a Dispute of Jesus at the Temple for the church of Sant'Agostino. He died of the plague in 1524.

References

1466 births
1524 deaths
Painters from Messina
15th-century Italian painters
Italian male painters
16th-century Italian painters
Italian Renaissance painters
16th-century deaths from plague (disease)